Traunstein is a Landkreis (district) in the southeastern part of Bavaria, Germany. Neighboring districts are (from the north clockwise) Mühldorf, Altötting, the Austrian states Upper Austria and Salzburg, the district Berchtesgadener Land, the Austrian states of Salzburg and Tyrol, and the district Rosenheim.

Geography
The district is located in the northern foothills of the Alps. The Chiemsee is located in the west of the district.

History
In 1972 the district was merged with parts of the former district Laufen, and the previously independent urban district Traunstein.

Coat of arms
The coat of arms shows a blue panther to the left, the symbol of the Spanheim dynasty of the Counts of Krainburg-Ortenburg, who owned part of the area in medieval times. The eagle in the top-right derives from the diocese of Chiemsee. In the bottom right there are the Canting Arms of Baumburg Abbey (Baumburg translates to tree-castle), which ruled most of the northern part of the district.

Towns and municipalities

Towns
 Tittmoning
 Traunreut
 Traunstein
 Trostberg

Markt
 Grassau
 Waging am See¹
¹ 

Verwaltungsgemeinschaften
 Bergen
 Marquartstein
 Obing
 Waging am See

Municipalities

|}

References

External links

 Official website (German)

 
Districts of Bavaria